A list of notable Slovenian art historians:

B

C 
Izidor Cankar

Č

H

K 
Miklavž Komelj

M 
Marko Marin
Luc Menaše

P

R

Š 
Majda Širca

V 
Anton Vodnik

Z 
Igor Zabel

 
Art historians